Admiral Briggs may refer to:

Charles Briggs (Royal Navy officer) (1858–1951), British Royal Navy admiral
Edward S. Briggs (1926–2022), U.S. Navy vice admiral
Thomas Briggs (Royal Navy officer) (1780–1852), British Royal Navy admiral